The Internazionali Femminili di Tennis Città di Caserta is a tournament for professional female tennis players played on outdoor clay courts. The event is classified as a $60,000 ITF Women's World Tennis Tour tournament and has been held in Caserta, Italy, since 1982.

Past finals

Singles

Doubles

External links
 ITF search 
 Official website

ITF Women's World Tennis Tour
Clay court tennis tournaments
Tennis tournaments in Italy
Recurring sporting events established in 1982